Live is the first live album by Swedish doom metal band Candlemass released in 1990.

Track listing 
 "The Well of Souls" - 5:23
 "Dark Are the Veils of Death" - 4:02
 "Bewitched" - 4:29
 "Solitude" - 5:43
 "Dark Reflections" - 4:44
 "Under the Oak" - 5:58
 "Demons Gate" - 8:52
 "Bells of Acheron" - 5:26
 "Through the Infinitive Halls of Death" - 5:26
 "Samarithan" - 5:11
 "Mirror Mirror" - 5:32
 "At the Gallows End" - 5:30
 "A Sorcerer's Pledge" 10:13

2008 reissue 
Disc one Live in Stockholm 09-06-1990
 "The Well of Souls"
 "Dark Are the Veils of Death"
 "Bewitched"
 "Solitude"
 "Dark Reflections"
 "Under the Oak"
 "Demons Gate"
 "Bells of Acheron"
 "Through the Infinitive Halls of Death"
 "Samarithan"
 "Mirror Mirror"
 "At the Gallows End"
 "A Sorcerer's Pledge"

Disc two Live at the Dynamo Open Air '88
 "Solitude"
 "At the Gallows End"
 "Crystal Ball"
 "Dark Are the Veils of Death"
 "A Sorcerer's Pledge"
 "Black Sabbath medley"
 "Crystal Ball" (live Fryshuset '90 LP version)
 "Bearer of Pain" (live Fryshuset '90 mixing desk bonus track)

Personnel
Candlemass
 Messiah Marcolin - vocals
 Mats Björkman - rhythm guitar
 Lars Johansson - lead guitar
 Leif Edling - bass guitar
 Jan Lindh - drums

Production
  Mats Lindfors - producer, engineer, mixing (1990 Live)

References

Candlemass (band) albums
1990 live albums
Music for Nations live albums
Metal Blade Records live albums